Rosemary Ann McAuliffe (née Belmont; born August 1, 1940) is a Democratic politician, elected as the Washington State Senator for the 1st District in 1992, beginning her term in 1993. Preceding her election to the State Senate, McAuliffe served 14 years on the Northshore School District Board of Education and as Chair of the Bothell Downtown Management Association, leading to the area's revitalization. This district includes Bothell, Mountlake Terrace, Brier, Maltby and parts of Lynnwood, Edmonds, and unincorporated Snohomish County. She served on the Washington State Senate's Early Learning & K-12 Education Committee as a ranking member, as well as on the Higher Learning Committee and Joint Select Committee on Education Accountability.

References

External links
State Senator Rosemary McAuliffe official government website
Follow the Money - Rosemary McAuliffe
2008 2006 2004 2000 1996 1992 campaign contributions
Senator Rosemary McAuliffe from the Senate Democratic Caucus

1940 births
Living people
Washington (state) state senators
Women state legislators in Washington (state)
Seattle University alumni
21st-century American politicians
21st-century American women politicians
People from Bothell, Washington